The  or Promenade plantée René-Dumont (French for ' of René Dumont') is a  elevated linear park built on top of obsolete railway infrastructure in the 12th arrondissement of Paris, France. It was inaugurated in 1993.

Description 

This  in Paris is an extensive green belt that follows the old  railway line. The shops are located in the arches of the former elevated railway viaduct, with the parkway being supported atop the viaduct. At that point, it becomes a grassy mall and then follows the old railway direction below street level towards the east, passing through several tunnels.

The elevated part of the route, on the viaduct, has some enclosed sections, as when it passes between modern buildings, and some open sections with expansive views. The western portion of the parkway may be accessed via stairways and elevators leading up to the elevated viaduct. This portion is reserved for pedestrians. The eastern portion of the parkway is accessible via ramps and stairways and is open to both pedestrians and cyclists. The staircase entrance is immediately on the left where  enters .

History

This Promenade Plantée is built on the former tracks of the Vincennes railway line, which, beginning in 1859, linked the Bastille station to Verneuil-l'Étang, after passing through Vincennes. It ceased operation on December 14, 1969; part of the line beyond Vincennes was integrated into Line A of the RER, while the Paris-Vincennes section was completely abandoned.

Beginning in the 1980s, the area was renovated. In 1984, the Bastille station was demolished to make way for the Opéra Bastille. The Reuilly section was designed in 1986; it incorporates the old commercial rail depot of Reuilly into a group of park areas. The Promenade Plantée was put into place at the same time in order to reuse the rest of the abandoned line between the Bastille and the old Montempoivre gate to the city. Landscape architect Jacques Vergely and architect Philippe Mathieux designed the parkway, which was inaugurated in 1993. The arcades of the Viaduc des Arts were renovated in 1989 by architect Patrick Berger, as was the new square Charles-Péguy.

Paris' promenade was one of the first projects in the world (if not the first) to repurpose elevated old railway lines as urban gardens. The first rail trails were created in the Midwest region of the USA, with the Elroy-Sparta Trail opening in 1965. Other repurposing projects have now been completed or are underway.  The first phase of the High Line, a similar park on an old railway-viaduct in the West Side of Manhattan New York City, was completed in 2009. The second phase was completed in 2011, bringing the total length of the High Line to 1.6 kilometres (1 mi); the third phase opened in September 2014, completing the park. Chicago has recently opened the nearly 4.8 kilometre (3-mi) Bloomingdale Trail, which will run through several city neighborhoods and allow bicycles.

In popular culture
The Promenade Plantée appears in the film Before Sunset, directed by Richard Linklater in 2004 with Ethan Hawke and Julie Delpy. It is also mentioned in the science fiction novel Olympos, by Dan Simmons.

Gallery

See also
 List of parks and gardens in Paris
 Rotterdam Hofplein railway station, similar former railway in Rotterdam
 High Line, elevated park in Manhattan, New York City
 Bloomingdale Trail, similar elevated park in Chicago
 Lowline, planned underground park in Manhattan, New York City
 Harsimus Stem Embankment, planned rail trail in Jersey City, New Jersey
 Maidashi ryokuchi, a park in Fukuoka, Japan
 Queensway, planned rail trail in Queens, New York City
 Rails-to-Trails Conservancy (RTC)
 Reading Viaduct, planned rail trail in Philadelphia
 Greenway, London
 The Atlanta Beltline, Atlanta, Georgia

References

External links

 Promenade Plantée's unofficial website
 Viaduc des Arts
 Atelier Le Tallec website
 Jardin de Reuilly, a park crossed by the Promenade Plantée

12th arrondissement of Paris
Linear parks
Parks and open spaces in Paris
Rail trails
Hiking trails in France
Buildings and structures in the 12th arrondissement of Paris
Elevated parks